Helena Helmersson (born 1973) is a Swedish business executive. Since 2010, she has been head of sustainability at the Swedish retail clothing company H&M, and since 2020 she is its CEO.

Biography 

Born in Skellefteå in the north of Sweden she grew up with her family (her parents and two sisters), Helmersson graduated with a master's degree in international business administration at the Umeå School of Business and Economics in 1997. On joining H&M in 1997, she became a section manager in the buying office before she went to Dhaka, Bangladesh in 2007 where she was H&M's production manager. After a further period serving as their department manager for underwear production in Hong Kong until 2010 when she returned to Stockholm to be manager for social responsibility and supply.

She was appointed CEO of H&M on 30th January, 2020. Helmersson's current responsibilities cover the improvement of the social and environmental sustainability of supply, contributing to H&M's sustainability strategy which was initially implemented in the 1990s.

On 5March 2014, Helmersson was elected Sweden's "Most Powerful Woman in Business" by the weekly business magazine Veckans Affärer. Interviewed by Alan Atkisson of GreenBiz, she commented: "I'm super proud and very happy. There is a gigantic amount of teamwork behind everything we do, and I take this as proof that it's been visible."

References 

1973 births
Living people
People from Skellefteå Municipality
Swedish business executives
Swedish women business executives
21st-century Swedish businesswomen
21st-century Swedish businesspeople
Umeå University alumni